The Lepidoptera of Easter Island consist of the butterflies and moths recorded from Easter Island.

Butterflies

Nymphalidae
Hypolimnas bolina otaheitae (C. Felder, 1862)
Vanessa carye (Hübner, 1812)

Moths

Cosmopterigidae
Asymphorodes trichogramma (J.F.G. Clarke, 1986)

Gelechiidae
Sitotroga cerealella (Olivier, 1789)

Geometridae
Gymnoscelis concinna (Swinhoe, 1902)

Noctuidae
Achaea janata (Linnaeus, 1758)
Agrotis ipsilon (Hufnagel, 1766)
Chrysodeixis eriosoma (Doubleday, 1843)
Ctenoplusia albostriata (Bremer & Grey, 1853)

Pterophoridae
Stenoptilia species

Pyralidae
Ephestia cautella (Walker, 1863)
Hymenia recurvalis (Fabricius, 1775)

Tineidae
Opogona aurisquamosa (Butler, 1881)

Tortricidae
Crocidosema plebejana (Zeller, 1847)

Yponomeutidae
Plutella xylostella (Linnaeus, 1758)

References

W. John Tennent: "A checklist of the butterflies of Melanesia, Micronesia, Polynesia and some adjacent areas". Zootaxa 1178: 1-209 (21 April 2006)
J.D. Holloway "The Lepidoptera of Easter, Pitcairn, and Henderson Islands" Journal of Natural History June 1990 24(3):719-729  

Easter Island
Easter Island
Easter Island
Lepidoptera
Lepidoptera